Brahmanpada may refer to any of the following villages in India:

 Brahmanpada, Nuapada, Odisha
 Brahmanpada, Palghar, Maharashtra